Ana Dangalakova (born 2 June 1987) is a Bulgarian former swimmer, who specialized in individual medley events. 

She claimed a gold medal in the 400m individual medley at the 2006 Mountain West Conference Championships in Oklahoma City, Oklahoma, in an outstanding time of 4:24.69. 

She is also the daughter of breaststroke specialist Tanya Dangalakova, who won Bulgaria's first and only gold medal in swimming at the 1988 Summer Olympics in Seoul, South Korea.

Career 
Dangalakova qualified for the women's 400m individual medley at the 2004 Summer Olympics in Athens, by attaining a B-standard entry time of 4:59.51 from the European Aquatics Championships in Madrid, Spain. She finished behind winner  Nimitta Thaveesupsoonthorn on the first heat by less than six hundredths of a second (0.06), in a time of 5:01.00. Dangalakova failed to qualify for the final, as she placed twenty-third overall in the morning's preliminary heats.

Dangalakova is also a member of the swimming team for the UNLV Rebels, and a graduate of hospitality management at the University of Nevada, Las Vegas.

References

External links
NBC Olympics Profile
Player Bio – UNLV Rebels 

1987 births
Living people
Bulgarian female swimmers
Olympic swimmers of Bulgaria
Swimmers at the 2004 Summer Olympics
Female medley swimmers
William F. Harrah College of Hotel Administration alumni
UNLV Rebels women's swimmers
Sportspeople from Sofia
20th-century Bulgarian women
21st-century Bulgarian women